Mary Winchester, or Zolûti to Mizos, (1865–1955) was a Scottish girl who was captured and held hostage by the Mizo tribes of Mizoram, India, in 1871, and rescued by the British expedition in 1872. This historic event marked the beginning of British rule in Mizoram that lasted until the Indian Independence in 1947. Indirectly, it also paved the way for Christian missionaries to introduce Christianity among the Mizos.

Kidnapping
Mary Winchester lived with her father at Cachar, Assam, India. She was an illegitimate child of James Winchester and his Meitei worker. Her father was a manager of the British tea plantation, and had been there for 12 years. When she turned six years of age in 1871, her father decided it was time for formal education in Britain. Her farewell party was arranged on 23 January at Alexandrapur plantation at the place owned by her father's close friend George Seller. While they were strolling in the garden, the workers were suddenly in commotion, and Seller was frantically galloping around on his horse. When Mary accompanied by a nurse headed towards the bungalow, her father met them on the way who ran her to a stable. But then the Mizo tribal warriors caught up, shot her father down from behind and cut his head. The warriors snatched her away from the dying clutch of her father, who murmured, "Dear, only God knows your fate." They left him to die and carried the girl away. A number of people were killed in the clash, some were taken as hostages, including Mary Winchester. Probably all except the girl, of whom they took special care, died on their journey to Mizoram.

In captivity
Mary Winchester was the first mixed race person most Mizos had ever encountered. Though a hostage, she was most of the time treated with good care. But some warriors wanted to depose her for fearing the consequences. She was finally lodged in the house of Bengkhuaia, the chief of Sailàm, one of the most formidable chiefdoms. Her arrival in the village was celebrated with wine and meat, led by the queen. Not understanding her language to know her name, the Mizos called her Zolûti (Zo for "Mizo" or "Mizoram", lût for "enter"). The village chief then entrusted the girl under the ward of his most trusted woman, Pi Tluangi, wife of the village elder Vansuakthanga (grandparents of Vangchhunga, one of the first three Mizo pastors). Pi Tluangi eventually cared for her like a princess, sleeping with her, and making garments and toys for her.

Rescue

The British colonial government was compelled to make a retaliation and recovery, a military campaign called the Lushai Expedition was launched on 8 October 1871. An expeditionary force of the British Indian Army captured and occupied Mizo villages one by one. The right column of the campaign reached Sailàm village on 21 January 1872. The siege started at 0830 in the morning, and after a few gunshots and shelling, the Mizos found their tribal weaponry no match to such advanced artillery and soon tendered their submission. After destroying the granaries and crops, the expeditionary force rescued Mary Winchester.

The moment of her rescue is told in two different versions:
according to T.H. Lewin, the expedition leader, Mary Winchester was simply taken from the chief's hut. She was found sitting on the log platform of the hut, wearing a blue rag round her loins, and a smoking pipe in her mouth. She was heard giving commands to small boys who were running around in fear. A few days short of a year in captivity, she had already lost her mother tongue, and the British soldiers had to lure her with sweets. 
according to Sailam residents, the popular story is that she was handed over by the queen. Being completely adapted to the Mizo life, other British were strangers to Mary Winchester. She even called them, "Foreigners." Therefore, Pi Tluangi on pretence took her to a forest for gathering firewoods (or for cleaning at the stream, yet in another version). In the forest, her guardian left her to the awaiting soldiers, who had to drag her away against her will.

In Britain
Mary Winchester was immediately transported to Calcutta and from there directly to Scotland. She lived with her grandparents in Elgin, Moray. She graduated from Royal Moray College, where she met Harry Innes Howie. They got married after she got a job as headmistress and moved to London. She died in 1955.

See also
List of kidnappings
List of solved missing person cases

References

External links
Brief autobiography

1865 births
1870s missing person cases
1955 deaths
Formerly missing people
Kidnapped British children
Kidnappings in India
Missing person cases in India
People from British India